United South High School is a high school located in the southern portion of Laredo, Texas and is a part of the United Independent School District. It consists of over 40 school organizations, and is home to mostly students with a Hispanic ethnicity. There is a no-bullying tolerance in the school, and the U.I.S.D dress code is strictly enforced. The school tries to involve as many inspirational activities as they can for the alumni of United South, including the Men's and Women's Youth Conferences, Career Day, and the inviting of special guest speakers from time to time. The school not only offers students with various academic courses (G/T & AP), it is also a college prep school, and even offers education in vocational programs (Construction Technology, Auto Body, Future Farmers of America, and Welding). It's even known for its Academy of Global Business and Advanced Technology. USHS is a growing campus to this present day.

The Academy 
United South High School houses The Academy of Global Business and Advanced Technology, a magnet school focused on business and technology education. This academy is a small section within the school. To be a part of it, students have to take a timed entrance exam. The students can choose technology or business. Business classes include Accounting I and Entrepreneurship (sophomores), Securities and Investments and Business Law (juniors), and Distribution and Logistics (seniors). Technology classes include A+ Certification (sophomores), Internetworking I (juniors), and Internetworking II (seniors). Magnet students are required to graduate on the distinguished plan and must have at least 250 community service hours, 4 measures, and 32 high school credits in order to do so.

Attendance boundary
Communities within the United South High boundary include portions of Laredo and the following census-designated places:

 Colorado Acres
 Hillside Acres
 La Coma
 Laredo Ranchettes
 Laredo Ranchettes West
 Las Haciendas
 Las Pilas
 Los Altos
 Los Arcos
 Los Centenarios
 Los Fresnos
 Los Nopalitos
 Los Veteranos I
 Pueblo East
 Pueblo Nuevo
 Ranchitos East
 Ranchitos Las Lomas
 San Carlos I
 San Carlos II
 Tanquecitos South Acres
 Tanquecitos South Acres II
 Valle Verde

References

External links
 

High schools in Laredo, Texas
United Independent School District high schools
Magnet schools in Texas